Kemal Akkaya is a professor at the Florida International University's (FIU) School of Computer and Information Sciences. He was made a fellow of the IEEE in 2023 "for contributions to routing and topology management in wireless ad hoc and sensor networks".

References 

Fellow Members of the IEEE
Year of birth missing (living people)
Living people
Place of birth missing (living people)
Florida International University faculty
Nationality missing